Tatarkhankent is a rural locality (a selo) in Ullugatagsky Selsoviet, Suleyman-Stalsky District, Republic of Dagestan, Russia. The population was 142 as of 2010.

Geography 
Tatarkhankent is located 16 km southwest of Kasumkent (the district's administrative centre) by road. Ptikent is the nearest rural locality.

References 

Rural localities in Suleyman-Stalsky District